Lorne John "Gump" Worsley (May 14, 1929 – January 26, 2007) was a professional ice hockey goaltender.  Born and raised in Montreal, Quebec, 'Gump' was given his nickname because friends thought he looked like comic-strip character Andy Gump.

Career
At the outset of his career, Worsley played four years in the minor leagues, most notably for the New York Rovers of the Eastern Hockey League (EHL), the St. Paul Saints of the United States Hockey League (USHL), and the Saskatoon Quakers of the Western Hockey League (WHL).  For three straight seasons between 1950 and 1952, he garnered First Team All-Star and leading goaltender recognition.

In the fall of 1952 he was signed by the New York Rangers of the NHL; though playing for a last-place team, won the Calder Memorial Trophy as rookie of the year.  However, after asking for a $500 a year pay increase, he was promptly returned to the minor leagues the following season. In 1954, playing for the Vancouver Canucks of the WHL, he won the league's most valuable player award.

Later in 1954, Worsley resumed as the Rangers starting goaltender, beating out future NHL star Johnny Bower.  Wearing the traditional number 1 for goaltenders, he toiled for the Rangers for the next nine seasons, generally playing well for poor-performing teams. Worsley made 43 saves in the 1955–56 New York Rangers season opener against the Chicago Blackhawks, setting a franchise record.

In the summer of 1963, he became involved in a proposed players' union, and was promptly traded to the Montreal Canadiens.  While he was relegated to the minor-league Quebec Aces for parts of two seasons—and characteristically winning First Team All-Star honors in the AHL in 1964—Worsley played his best years for the Canadiens as a member of four Stanley Cup-winning teams: 1965, 1966, 1968 and 1969.  His best season was 1968, where he followed up a Vezina-winning performance and a career-low 1.98 goals-against average by going undefeated in the playoffs with eleven straight wins. However, he soon had a dispute with general manager Sam Pollock over being demoted to the minors; the decision by head coach Claude Ruel to favor Rogatien Vachon (who like Worsley was also a future Hall of Fame goaltender) over Worsley made him quit in the midst of the 1969–70 season. Suspended for not reporting to the Canadiens' Montreal Voyageurs farm team, he was replaced by Phil Myre.

Worsley was lured from retirement by the Minnesota North Stars to play in tandem with Cesare Maniago; he starred for parts of five more years, retiring at the age of 44 after the 1973–74 season. His best season with the North Stars was 1972, where he was second in the league with a 2.12 goals-against average.  Named to play in the 25th National Hockey League All-Star Game, Worsley was the second goaltender to have won 300 games and lost 300 games, after Harry Lumley.  This feat was later accomplished by several other goaltenders.

Worsley was known for his wry sense of humour and various eccentricities. Early in his career with the Rangers, regularly facing 40–50 shots a night, he was asked: "Which team gives you the most trouble?" His reply – "The New York Rangers."  Accused by Rangers' coach Phil Watson of having a beer belly, he replied, "Just goes to show you what he knows. I only drink Johnnie Walker Red."

Worsley was vehemently opposed to wearing a mask.  He was the second-to-last professional hockey goaltender to play without a mask. Andy Brown of the Indianapolis Racers was the last, the following season—wearing a mask in the last six games of his career. Asked about why he chose to go without, Worsley told reporters: "My face is my mask."

Worsley was also well known for his fear of flying.  On November 25, 1968, en route to Los Angeles, he suffered a nervous breakdown after a rough flight from Montreal's Dorval Airport to Chicago. It has been reported that a stewardess upon landing came over the PA system and said that if passengers wished to claim refunds for drycleaning they should submit receipts. Gump apparently quipped "Does that include underwear?" Subsequently, he received psychiatric treatment and missed action. It is said upon emerging from retirement to play for the North Stars he was assured, as Minnesota was in the central part of the continent, the team traveled less than any other in the league.

Soccer career
Worsley was an excellent soccer player, beginning his career as a junior with Westmount. In 1948 he was a member of the Montreal youth all-star team.  As a promising young player, he soon attracted attention; the following year he moved up to McMasterville in the Montreal League.  There he was selected to play in a trial game from which the Montreal all-stars were chosen to play the touring English club Fulham in 1951.

In the summer of 1952, while playing hockey for the Saskatoon Quakers, he played centre forward for the Saskatoon All-stars against the touring Tottenham Hotspur from England. In 1953, he joined Montréal Hakoah FC and helped his new club to the Canadian final, but they lost the three-game series to the Westminster Royals. In 1954, continued his soccer career with Montreal Vickers. His father was also an outstanding soccer player and won a Canadian championship medal with Montreal Grand Trunk in 1919.

Injuries
Worsley suffered many injuries during his career, including: a near career-ending back injury while with Vancouver of the WHL, when Gus Kyle hit him from behind; a knee problem in the 1956 playoffs that required surgery; a severed tendon in 1960; in 1961, a blistering shot from Bobby Hull that hit him in the forehead; a pulled hamstring that same year; a pulled hamstring in 1963–64; knee surgery in 1966, followed by a sprained knee then a concussion from a hard-boiled egg thrown by a New York fan; a broken finger in the 1969 playoffs; a pulled hamstring in 1972–73 that reduced his effectiveness to the point he temporarily retired from hockey.  The blast to the forehead from Bobby Hull landed him, unconscious, in Montreal's Royal Victoria Hospital. Upon awakening, asked how he was feeling, Gump replied: "Good thing the puck hit me flat!"

Retirement and death
At the time of his retirement, Worsley had played more games than any goalie except for Terry Sawchuk and Glenn Hall.  He retired with a record of 335 wins, 352 losses and 150 ties, with 43 shutouts, and a goals-against average of 2.91.

Worsley suffered a heart attack on January 22, 2007, and died at Hôpital Honoré-Mercier in Saint-Hyacinthe, Quebec on January 26, 2007. He was survived by his wife, Doreen Chapman and his children Lorne, Dean, Drew, and Lianne.

Legacy
Two Canadian indie rock bands, Huevos Rancheros ("Gump Worsley's Lament") and The Weakerthans ("Elegy for Gump Worsley"), have recorded tribute songs to Worsley. Canadian band Sons of Freedom also named their second album Gump after Worsley.

Career achievements and facts
 Won the Calder Memorial Trophy in 1953.
 Stanley Cup champion in 1965, 1966, 1968, and 1969.
 Won the Vezina Trophy in 1966 and 1968.
 Named to the NHL First All-Star Team in 1968.
 Named to the NHL Second All-Star Team in 1966.
 Played in the NHL All-Star Game in 1961, 1962, 1965, and 1972.
 Tied with Curtis Joseph for the second-most career losses in the NHL with 352.
 Currently 7th in all-time games played, 15th in career wins and 24th in shutouts.
 Inducted into the Hockey Hall of Fame in 1980.
 One of the last two goaltenders (the other being Andy Brown) to play in the NHL without a face mask, doing so until his final season.
 Was affectionately known to Minnesota North Stars fans as "the Gumper".
 This is where the popular term "Stacking the Gumpers" originated.  Stacking the Gumpers is how a goaltender makes a save by lying on his side and making a "wall" out of his leg pads or "Gumpers."
 In the 2009 book 100 Ranger Greats, was ranked No. 17 all-time of the 901 New York Rangers who had played during the team's first 82 seasons

Career statistics

Regular season and playoffs

* Stanley Cup Champion.

References

They Call Me Gump by Lorne "Gump" Worsley with Tim Moriarty
The Trail of the Stanley Cup, Volume 3 by Charles L. Coleman
The Complete Encyclopedia of Hockey edited by Zander Hollander

External links

Subject of The Weakerthans song, Elegy for Gump Worsley  

1929 births
2007 deaths
Anglophone Quebec people
Calder Trophy winners
Canadian ice hockey goaltenders
Edmonton Flyers (WHL) players
Hockey Hall of Fame inductees
Ice hockey people from Montreal
Minnesota North Stars coaches
Minnesota North Stars players
Minnesota North Stars scouts
Montreal Canadiens players
New Haven Ramblers players
New York Rangers players
Providence Reds players
Quebec Aces (AHL) players
Saskatoon Quakers players
Springfield Indians players
Stanley Cup champions
Vancouver Canucks (WHL) players
Vezina Trophy winners
Canadian ice hockey coaches
People from Beloeil, Quebec